Canscora alata is a herbaceous species of plant in the family Gentianaceae, with a self-supporting growth habit. It is commonly known as samgamoli, kanjenkora, sangupushpi, sangupushpi, kanjenkora and samgamoli. It is growing in moist deciduous forests, also in the plains. it is widely distributed in tropical Africa and South Asia.

Description
Canscora alata is an erect herbs to 35 cm high; stem narrowly 4-winged. Leaves are 1.5-2.5 x 0.8-1.5 cm, elliptic-lanceolate, base rounded, apex acute, 3-nerved at base, subsessile. Cymes dichasial, axillary or terminal; pedicel 1-1.5 cm long, winged. Flowering and fruiting are from November to December. Seeds are angular.

Uses
As an ayurvedic herb, Canscora alata is used for various diseases.

References

Gentianaceae